Events in the year 2007 in Hong Kong.

Incumbents
 Chief Executive: Donald Tsang

Events
In January 2007, rules were passed to limit the number of pregnant women from mainland China who could give birth in Hong Kong, thus obtaining residency rights for their children.

In March 2007, Chief Executive Donald Tsang won elections for a new five-year term.

In July 2007, with the 10th anniversary of Hong Kong's handover to China, Tsang's new government is sworn in.

See also
 List of Hong Kong films of 2007

References

 
Years of the 21st century in Hong Kong
Hong Kong
Hong Kong